{{Infobox locomotive
| name = South Australian Railways 700 class
| powertype = Diesel-electric
| image = Former South Australian Railways diesel-electric locomotive no 703 at National Railway Museum (Bob Sampson).jpg
| imagesize = 400px
| alt = 
| caption = 703 on delivery to the National Railway Museum, Port Adelaide by donor One Rail Australia, January 2023
| builder = AE Goodwin, Auburn
| ordernumber = 
| serialnumber = Alco G-6042-01 to G-6042-03Alco G-6059-01 to G-6059-03
| buildmodel = Alco DL 500G
| builddate = 1971–1972
| totalproduction = 6
| rebuilder = 
| rebuilddate = 
| numberrebuilt = 
| aarwheels = 
| uicclass = Co-Co
| gauge = 
| trucks = 
| bogies = 
| wheeldiameter = 
| trailingdiameter = 
| minimumcurve = 
| wheelbase = 
| length = Over coupler pulling faces: 
| width = 
| height = 
| axleload = 
| weightondrivers = 
| locoweight = 
| fueltype = Diesel
| fuelcap = 
| lubecap = 
| coolantcap = 
| watercap = 
| sandcap = 
| powersupply = 
| consumption = 
| watercons = 
| primemover = Alco 251C
| rpmrange = 
| enginetype = Four-stroke V12 diesel
| aspiration = Turbocharged
| displacement = 
| alternator = 
| generator = 
| tractionmotors = 
| headendpower = 
| cylindercount = 12
| cylindersize =  
| transmission = 
| multipleworking = 
| maxspeed = 
| poweroutput = Gross: ,
| tractiveeffort = Continuous:  at ,Starting: 
| factorofadhesion = 
| operator = South Australian Railways, Australian National, One Rail Australia and predecessors
| operatorclass = 
| powerclass = 
| numinclass = 6
| fleetnumbers = 700–705 (700 later renumbered to 706)
| officialname = 
| nicknames = 
| axleloadclass = 
| locale = 
| deliverydate = 
| firstrundate = 22 June 1971
| lastrundate = 2015
| retiredate = 
| withdrawndate = 
| preservedunits = 701, 703, 704 (operational or to be made operational), 705 (static display)
| restoredate = 
| scrapdate = 
| currentowner = 
}}

The 700 class is a class of six diesel-electric locomotives based on the Alco DL500G model, built by AE Goodwin, Auburn, New South Wales for the South Australian Railways. They are virtually identical to the New South Wales 442 class locomotive.

History
The locomotives, built in 1971 and 1972, operated on all main lines in South Australia and interstate to Broken Hill and Melbourne.

The first three were delivered on  broad gauge bogies and the latter three on  standard gauge bogies. All were initially delivered in the South Australian Railways' red and silver colour scheme. The three standard-gauge locomotives were soon repainted in the South Australian Railways' "mustard pot" colour scheme (orange with brown lining and silver bogies).

In 1975, 703 was damaged when a bridge at Crystal Brook collapsed and was repaired at Islington Workshops.

In 1978, all six locomotives were included in the transfer of the South Australian Railways non-metropolitan assets to the Australian National Railways Commission. 703 was transferred back to broad gauge in 1979, to help cover the withdrawal of the first of the 900 class. After the Adelaide to Port Pirie railway line was converted to standard gauge in 1982, all four broad gauge locomotives were converted to standard gauge, marking the first time the entire class was on the same gauge.

In 1986, a new Australian National Railways computer system required the class leaders of the former SAR fleet to be renumbered as the last member of the class; thus 700 became 706. During 1987, all six locomotives were transferred to broad gauge to cover a locomotive shortfall as the older 930 class was withdrawn.

In 1994, 702 caught fire near Blackwood; it was scrapped in 1997.

After the conversion to standard gauge of the Adelaide-Melbourne railway line in 1995, all of the remaining 700 class were converted to standard gauge.

In 1997, the remaining five units were included in the sale of Australian National assets to Australian Southern Railroad. 706 was transferred back to broad gauge in 2000 to work on the daily Penrice stone train. Several years later it suffered a mechanical failure and was not repaired; in 2022 its engine unit was sold to the Australian Locomotive and Railway Carriage Company and its (broad-gauge) bogies were donated to the National Railway Museum, to be placed under 703's body, which One Rail Australia had donated. 704 was transferred to broad gauge to replace it, running until 2014, when it was stored after the Penrice stone train service ceased.

The remaining three locomotives (701, 703 and 705) were mostly used on intrastate grain trains (together with GM and 22 class locomotives), especially on the lightly laid branch lines from Tailem Bend to Loxton and Pinnaroo, where more powerful but heavier locomotives were unable to go. They were also used as banker locomotives to assist trains up the steep grades of the Adelaide to Tailem Bend railway line. 701 was named Tailem Bend'' in 2014. In 2015, after the Loxton and Pinnaroo branch lines closed, 701 and 703 were stored in serviceable condition. 705 had suffered a major mechanical failure earlier in the year, and was deemed to be not economically repairable.

Locomotive 703, donated by One Rail Australia, was delivered to the National Railway Museum, Port Adelaide, in January 2023 as a significant display item and for shunt duties.

Disposition
, the disposition of the remaining five 700 class locomotives was as follows:

References

A. E. Goodwin locomotives
Co-Co locomotives
Railway locomotives introduced in 1971
700
Standard gauge locomotives of Australia
Broad gauge locomotives in Australia
Diesel-electric locomotives of Australia